Calomnion complanatum is a species of moss native to Australia (New South Wales, Victoria, Tasmania) and New Zealand. It is the type species of the genus Calomnion, growing on the trunks of tree ferns. It is a small, yellow-green plant rarely more than 10 mm tall.

Within New South Wales, Calomnion complanatum is an endangered species reported from only 4 populations, all in New South Wales: Cambewarra Mountain, Rocky Creek Canyon on the Newnes Plateau, and two sites on Mount Wilson (Zircon Creek and Waterfall Reserve). It is listed as endangered in Victoria but rare and not endangered in Tasmania or New Zealand.

References

Rhizogoniales
Flora of New South Wales
Flora of Victoria (Australia)
Flora of Tasmania
Flora of New Zealand